The Milton Area School District is a small, rural public school district headquartered in Milton, Pennsylvania. The district is located in Northumberland and Union counties. According to 2000 federal census data, it served a resident population of 15,510. By 2010, the Milton Area School District's population increased to 16,561 people. The educational attainment levels for the School District population (25 years old and over) were 85.5% high school graduates and 13% college graduates. The district is one of the 500 public school districts of Pennsylvania.

According to the Pennsylvania Budget and Policy Center, 51.4% of the district's pupils lived at 185% or below the Federal Poverty Level  as shown by their eligibility for the federal free or reduced price school meal programs in 2012. In 2009, the Milton Area School District residents' per capita income was $17,781, while the median family income was $43,023 a year. In the Commonwealth, the median family income was $49,501 and the United States median family income was $49,445, in 2010. In Northumberland County, the median household income was $41,208. By 2013, the median household income in the United States rose to $52,100. In 2014, the median household income in the USA was $53,700.

Extracurriculars
Milton Area School District offers a variety of clubs, activities and an extensive sports program.

Athletics
Milton High School participates in various sports through the Pennsylvania Interscholastic Athletic Association and is a member of the Pennsylvania Heartland Athletic Conference since 2008-2009 school year. The Pennsylvania Heartland Athletic Conference is a voluntary association of 25 PIAA High Schools within the central Pennsylvania region.

The district funds:

Boys
Baseball - AAA
Basketball- AAA
Bowling - AAAA
Cross Country - AA
Football - AA
Golf - AAA
Soccer - AA
Tennis - AA
Track and Field - AAA
Wrestling - AA

Girls
Basketball - AAA
Bowling - AAAA
Cross Country - AA
Field Hockey - AA
Golf - AA
Soccer (Fall) - AA
Softball - AA
Girls' Tennis - AA
Track and Field - AA

Middle School Sports:

Boys:
Basketball
Cross Country
Football
Soccer
Wrestling

Girls:
Basketball
Cross Country
Field Hockey

References

External links
 Milton Area School District
 Central Susquehanna Intermediate Unit

School districts in Northumberland County, Pennsylvania
School districts in Union County, Pennsylvania
Susquehanna Valley